Govender is a surname. Notable people with the surname include:

Karthy Govender, South African human rights commissioner and academic
Kessie Govender (1942–2002), South African playwright and actor
Maggie Govender, South African politician
Rogers Govender (born 1960), Church of England dean
Ronnie Govender (1934–2021), South African playwright and writer
Venitia Govender, South African activist

See also
Gounder (title)

Surnames of Indian origin